Grethen is a surname. Notable people with the surname include:

Charles Grethen (born 1992), Luxembourgian middle-distance runner
Fonsy Grethen (born 1960), Luxembourgian carom billiards player
Henri Grethen (born 1950), Luxembourgian politician
Luc Grethen, Luxembourgian composer and musician